Pettenbach is a municipality in the district of Kirchdorf an der Krems in the Austrian state of Upper Austria.

Geography
Pettenbach lies in the Traunviertel. About 16 percent of the municipality is forest, and 74 percent is farmland.

References

Cities and towns in Kirchdorf an der Krems District